|}

The Devenish Chase is a Grade 2 National Hunt steeplechase in Ireland which is open to horses aged five years or older. It is run at Fairyhouse over a distance of about 2 miles and 4 furlongs (4,023 metres), and during its running there are sixteen fences to be jumped. The race is scheduled to take place each year on Easter Monday.

The race was run for the first time in 2018. It was created when Fairyhouse and Navan agreed to swap the distances of their two Graded Chases scheduled for the spring.
The Webster Cup Chase held at Navan is now run over 2 miles (previously 2 miles 4 furlongs) and the Normans Grove Chase, at Fairyhouse, (2 miles 1 furlong) was replaced by this race over 2 miles and 4 furlongs.

Records
Leading jockey:
 Brian Hayes -  Easy Game (2021,2022)

Leading trainer (3 wins):
 Willie Mullins -  Un de Sceaux (2018), Easy Game (2021,2022)

Winners

See also
 Horse racing in Ireland
 List of Irish National Hunt races

References

 Racing Post:

National Hunt races in Ireland
National Hunt chases
Fairyhouse Racecourse
Recurring sporting events established in 2018
2018 establishments in Ireland